YellowTimes.org was a website that operated for a few years and published daily news and articles, many of which were critical of corporate power, industrial pollution, human rights abuses and war. It was edited by Canadian journalist Firas Al-Atraqchi. After publishing photographs of the coffins of U.S. soldiers being transported from Afghanistan, the site was shut down by its internet hosting service on March 24, 2003.

Links & Sources
 "War Pictures Cause Yellowtimes.Org To Be Shut Down" by Firas Al-Atraqchi on 'Scoop.co.nz'
 "YellowTimes.org Shut Down! Stifling the Voice of Reason" by Firas Al-Atraqchi on 'Dissident Voice'

Canadian news websites